Méry-la-Bataille is a commune in the Oise department in northern France.

History 
Méry took the name of Méry-la-Bataille in 1932. The name of Méry is on the statue of general Mangin near the church Saint-François-Xavier in Paris.

See also
 Communes of the Oise department

References

Communes of Oise